Newtown is an unincorporated community in King and Queen County, Virginia, United States.
 
The Newtown Historic District and Providence Plantation and Farm are listed on the National Register of Historic Places.

Newtown is known today for its championship sand drag racing track (sanctioned 300 foot).

References

Unincorporated communities in King and Queen County, Virginia
Unincorporated communities in Virginia